Ted Williams (1918–2002) was an American baseball player.

Ted Williams may also refer to:

Ted Williams (back) (1916–1993), American football back
Ted Williams (American football coach) (born 1943), American football coach
Ted Williams (equestrian) (1912–1993), British show-jump rider, active in the 1950s and 1960s
Ted Williams (tennis) (1866–1911), British tennis player and Wimbledon doubles finalist in 1884.
Ted Williams (Australian footballer) (1912–1964), Australian rules footballer
Ted Williams (media personality)

See also
Teddy Williams (disambiguation)
Edward Williams (disambiguation)
Tad Williams (born 1957), American writer